Fela Aníkúlápó Kuti (born Olufela Olusegun Oludotun Ransome-Kuti; 15 October 1938 – 2 August 1997), also known as Abami Eda, was a Nigerian musician, bandleader, composer, political activist, and Pan-Africanist. He is regarded as the pioneer of Afrobeat, a Nigerian music genre that combines West African music with American funk and jazz. At the height of his popularity, he was referred to as one of Africa's most "challenging and charismatic music performers". AllMusic described him as a musical and sociopolitical voice of international significance.

Kuti was the son of Nigerian women's rights activist Funmilayo Ransome-Kuti. After early experiences abroad, he and his band Africa 70 (featuring drummer and musical director Tony Allen) shot to stardom in Nigeria during the 1970s, during which he was an outspoken critic and target of Nigeria's military juntas. In 1970, he founded the Kalakuta Republic commune, which declared itself independent from military rule. The commune was destroyed in a 1978 raid. He was jailed by the government of Muhammadu Buhari in 1984, but released after 20 months. He continued to record and perform through the 1980s and 1990s. Since his death in 1997, reissues and compilations of his music have been overseen by his son, Femi Kuti.

Early life and career

Early life 
Olufela Olusegun Oludotun Ransome-Kuti was born into the Ransome-Kuti family, an upper-middle-class Nigerian family, on 15 October 1938 in Abeokuta (the modern-day capital of Ogun State), which at the time was a city in the British Colony of Nigeria. His mother, Chief Funmilayo Ransome-Kuti, was an anti-colonial feminist, and his father, Reverend Israel Oludotun Ransome-Kuti, was an Anglican minister, school principal, and the first president of the Nigeria Union of Teachers. Kuti's parents both played active roles in the anti-colonial movement in Nigeria, most notably the Abeokuta Women's Riots which was led by his mother in 1946. His brothers Beko Ransome-Kuti and Olikoye Ransome-Kuti, both medical doctors, were well known nationally. Kuti Is a cousin to the writer and laureate Wole Soyinka, a Nobel Prize for Literature winner. They are both descendants of Josiah Ransome-Kuti, who is Kuti's paternal grandfather and Soyinka's maternal great-grandfather.

Kuti attended Abeokuta Grammar School. In 1958, he was sent to London to study medicine but decided to study music instead at the Trinity College of Music, with the trumpet being his preferred instrument. While there, he formed the band Koola Lobitos and played a fusion of jazz and highlife. In 1960, Kuti married his first wife, Remilekun (Remi) Taylor, with whom he had three children (Femi, Yeni, and Sola). In 1963, Kuti moved back to the newly independent Federation of Nigeria, re-formed Koola Lobitos, and trained as a radio producer for the Nigerian Broadcasting Corporation. He played for some time with Victor Olaiya and his All-Stars.

He called his style Afrobeat, a combination of Fuji music, funk, jazz, highlife, salsa, calypso, and traditional Yoruba music. In 1969, Kuti took the band to the United States and spent ten months in Los Angeles. While there, he discovered the Black Power movement through Sandra Smith (now known as Sandra Izsadore or Sandra Akanke Isidore), a partisan of the Black Panther Party. This experience heavily influenced his music and political views. He renamed the band Nigeria 70. Soon after, the Immigration and Naturalization Service was tipped off by a promoter that Kuti and his band were in the US without work permits. The band performed a quick recording session in Los Angeles that would later be released as The '69 Los Angeles Sessions.

1970s
After Kuti and his band returned to Nigeria, the group was renamed (the) Africa '70 as lyrical themes changed from love to social issues. He formed the Kalakuta Republic—a commune, recording studio, and home for many people connected to the band—which he later declared independent from the Nigerian state.

Kuti set up a nightclub in the Empire Hotel, first named the Afro-Spot and later the Afrika Shrine, where he both performed regularly and officiated at personalised Yoruba traditional ceremonies in honor of his nation's ancestral faith. He also changed his name to Anikulapo (meaning "He who carries death in his pouch", with the interpretation: "I will be the master of my own destiny and will decide when it is time for death to take me"). He stopped using the hyphenated surname "Ransome" because he considered it a slave name.

Kuti's music was popular among the Nigerian public and Africans in general. He decided to sing in Pidgin English so that individuals all over Africa could enjoy his music, where the local languages they speak are diverse and numerous. As popular as Kuti's music had become in Nigeria and elsewhere, it was unpopular with the ruling government, and raids on the Kalakuta Republic were frequent. During 1972, Ginger Baker recorded Stratavarious, with Kuti appearing alongside vocalist and guitarist Bobby Tench. Around this time, Kuti became even more involved with the Yoruba religion.

In 1977, Kuti and Africa 70 released the album Zombie, which heavily criticized Nigerian soldiers, and used the zombie metaphor to describe the Nigerian military's methods. The album was a massive success and infuriated the government, who raided the Kalakuta Republic with 1,000 soldiers. During the raid, Kuti was severely beaten, and his elderly mother (the first woman to drive a car in Nigeria) was fatally injured after being thrown from a window. The commune was burnt down, and Kuti's studio, instruments, and master tapes were destroyed. Kuti claimed that he would have been killed had it not been for a commanding officer's intervention as he was being beaten. Kuti's response to the attack was to deliver his mother's coffin to the Dodan Barracks in Lagos, General Olusegun Obasanjo's residence, and to write two songs, "Coffin for Head of State" and "Unknown Soldier," referencing the official inquiry that claimed an unknown soldier had destroyed the commune.

Kuti and his band took up residence in Crossroads Hotel after the Shrine had been destroyed along with the commune. In 1978, he married 27 women, many of whom were dancers, composers, and singers with whom he worked. The marriage served not only to mark the anniversary of the attack on the Kalakuta Republic but also to protect Kuti and his wives from authorities' false claims that Kuti was kidnapping women. Later, he adopted a rotation system of maintaining 12 simultaneous wives. There were also two concerts in the year: the first was in Accra, in which rioting broke out during the song "Zombie", which caused Kuti to be banned from entering Ghana; the second was after the Berlin Jazz Festival when most of Kuti's musicians deserted him due to rumours that he planned to use all of the proceeds to fund his presidential campaign.

In 1979, Kuti formed his political party, which he called Movement of the People (MOP), to "clean up society like a mop", but it quickly became inactive due to his confrontations with the government of the day. MOP preached Nkrumahism and Africanism.

1980s and beyond

In 1983, Kuti nominated himself for president in Nigeria's first elections in decades, but his candidature was refused. At this time, Kuti created a new band, Egypt 80, which reflected the view that Egyptian civilization, knowledge, philosophy, mathematics, and religious systems are African and must be claimed as such. Kuti stated in an interview: "Stressing the point that I have to make Africans aware of the fact that Egyptian civilization belongs to the African. So that was the reason why I changed the name of my band to Egypt 80." Kuti continued to record albums and tour the country. He further infuriated the political establishment by implicating ITT Corporation's vice-president, Moshood Abiola, and Obasanjo in the popular 25-minute political screed entitled "I.T.T. (International Thief-Thief)".

In 1984, Muhammadu Buhari's government, of which Kuti was a vocal opponent, jailed him on a charge of currency smuggling. Amnesty International and others denounced the charges as politically motivated. Amnesty designated him a prisoner of conscience, and other human rights groups also took up his case. After 20 months, General Ibrahim Babangida released him from prison. On his release, Kuti divorced his 12 remaining wives, citing "marriage brings jealousy and selfishness" since his wives would regularly compete for superiority.

Kuti continued to release albums with Egypt 80 and toured in the United States and Europe while continuing to be politically active. In 1986, he performed in Giants Stadium in New Jersey as part of Amnesty International's A Conspiracy of Hope concert along with Bono, Carlos Santana, and the Neville Brothers. In 1989, Kuti and Egypt 80 released the anti-apartheid album Beasts of No Nation that depicted U.S. President Ronald Reagan, UK Prime Minister Margaret Thatcher, and South African State President Pieter Willem Botha on its cover. The title of the composition evolved out of a statement by Botha: "This uprising [against the apartheid system] will bring out the beast in us."

Kuti's album output slowed in the 1990s, and eventually, he ceased releasing albums altogether. On 21 January 1993, he and four members of Africa 70 were arrested and were later charged on 25 January for the murder of an electrician. Rumours also speculated that he was suffering from an illness for which he was refusing treatment. However, there had been no confirmed statement from Kuti about this speculation.

Death 
On 3 August 1997, Kuti's brother Olikoye Ransome-Kuti, already a prominent AIDS activist and former Minister of Health, announced that Kuti had died on the previous day from complications related to AIDS. Kuti had been an AIDS denialist, and his widow maintained that he did not die of AIDS. His youngest son Seun took the role of leading Kuti's former band Egypt 80. , the band is still active, releasing music under the moniker Seun Kuti & Egypt 80.

Music

Music 
Kuti's musical style is called Afrobeat. It is a style he largely created, and is a complex fusion of jazz, funk, highlife, and traditional Nigerian, African chants and rhythms. It contains elements of psychedelic soul and has similarities to James Brown's music. Afrobeat also borrows heavily from the native "tinker pan". Tony Allen, Kuti's drummer of twenty years, was instrumental in the creation of Afrobeat. Kuti once stated that "there would be no Afrobeat without Tony Allen".

Kuti's band was notable for featuring two baritone saxophones when most groups only used one. This is a common technique in African and African-influenced musical styles and can be seen in funk and hip hop. His bands sometimes performed with two bassists at the same time both playing interlocking melodies and rhythms. There were always two or more guitarists. The electric West African style guitar in Afrobeat bands is a key part of the sound, and is used to give basic structure, playing a repeating chordal/melodic statement, riff, or groove.

Some elements often present in Kuti's music are the call-and-response within the chorus and figurative but simple lyrics. His songs were also very long, at least 10–15 minutes in length, and many reached 20 or 30 minutes, while some unreleased tracks would last up to 45 minutes when performed live. Their length was one of many reasons that his music never reached a substantial degree of popularity outside Africa. His LP records frequently had one 30-minute track per side. Typically there is an "instrumental introduction" jam section of the song roughly 10–15 minutes long before Kuti starts singing the "main" part of the song, featuring his lyrics and singing, for another 10–15 minutes. On some recordings, his songs are divided into two parts: Part 1 being the instrumental, and Part 2 adding in vocals.

Kuti's songs are mostly sung in Nigerian pidgin English, although he also performed a few songs in the Yoruba language. His main instruments were the saxophone and the keyboards, but he also played the trumpet, electric guitar, and the occasional drum solo. Kuti refused to perform songs again after he had already recorded them, which hindered his popularity outside Africa.

The subject of Kuti's songs tended to be very complex. They regularly challenged common received notions in the manner of political commentary through song. Many of his songs also expressed a form of parody and satire. The main theme he conveyed through his music was the search for justice through exploration of political and social topics that affected the common people.

Showmanship 
Kuti was known for his showmanship, and his concerts were often outlandish and wild. He referred to his stage act as the "Underground Spiritual Game". Many expected him to perform shows like those in the Western world, but during the 1980s, he was not interested in putting on a "show". His European performance was a representation of what was relevant at the time and his other inspirations. He attempted to make a movie but lost all the materials to the fire that was set to his house by the military government in power. He thought that art, and thus his own music, should have political meaning.

Kuti's concerts also regularly involved female singers and dancers, later dubbed as "Queens." The Queens were women who helped influence the popularization of his music. They were dressed colorfully and wore makeup all over their bodies that expressed their visual creativity. The singers of the group played a backup role for Kuti, usually echoing his words or humming along, while the dancers would put on a performance of an erotic manner. This began to spark controversy due to the nature of their involvement with Kuti's political tone, along with the reality that a lot of the women were young.

Kuti was part of an Afrocentric consciousness movement that was founded on and delivered through his music. In an interview included in Hank Bordowitz's Noise of the World, Kuti stated:Music is supposed to have an effect. If you're playing music and people don't feel something, you're not doing shit. That's what African music is about. When you hear something, you must move. I want to move people to dance, but also to think. Music wants to dictate a better life, against a bad life. When you're listening to something that depicts having a better life, and you're not having a better life, it must have an effect on you.

Political views and activism

Activism 
Kuti was highly engaged in political activism in Africa from the 1970s until his death. He criticized the corruption of Nigerian government officials and the mistreatment of Nigerian citizens. He spoke of colonialism as the root of the socio-economic and political problems that plagued the African people. Corruption was one of the worst political problems facing Africa in the 1970s and Nigeria was among the most corrupt countries. Its government rigged elections and performed coups that ultimately worsened poverty, economic inequality, unemployment, and political instability, further promoting corruption and crime. Kuti's protest songs covered themes inspired by the realities of corruption and socio-economic inequality in Africa. Kuti's political statements could be heard throughout Africa.

Kuti's open vocalization of the violent and oppressive regime controlling Nigeria did not come without consequence. He was arrested on over 200 different occasions and spent time in jail, including his longest stint of 20 months after his arrest in 1984. On top of jail time, the corrupt government sent soldiers to beat Kuti, his family and friends, and destroy wherever he lived and whatever instruments or recordings he had.

In the 1970s, Kuti began to run outspoken political columns in the advertising space of daily and weekly newspapers such as The Daily Times and The Punch, bypassing editorial censorship in Nigeria's predominantly state-controlled media. Published throughout the 1970s and early 1980s under the title "Chief Priest Say", these columns were extensions of Kuti's famous Yabi Sessions—consciousness-raising word-sound rituals, with himself as chief priest, conducted at his Lagos nightclub. Organized around a militantly Afrocentric rendering of history and the essence of black beauty, "Chief Priest Say" focused on the role of cultural hegemony in the continuing subjugation of Africans. Kuti addressed many topics, from fierce denunciations of the Nigerian Government's criminal behavior, Islam and Christianity's exploitative nature, and evil multinational corporations; to deconstructions of Western medicine, Black Muslims, sex, pollution, and poverty. "Chief Priest Say" was eventually canceled by The Daily Times and The Punch. Many have speculated that the paper's editors were pressured to stop publication, including threats of violence.

Political views 

Kuti's lyrics expressed his inner thoughts. His rise in popularity throughout the 1970s signaled a change in the relation between music as an art form and Nigerian socio-political discourse. In 1984, he critiqued and insulted the authoritarian then-president of the Federal Republic of Nigeria, Muhammadu Buhari. "Beast of No Nation", one of his most popular songs, refers to Buhari as an "animal in a madman's body"; in Nigerian Pidgin: "No be outside Buhari dey ee / na craze man be dat / animal in craze man skini." Kuti strongly believed in Africa and always preached peace among its people. He thought the most important way for them to fight European cultural imperialism was to support traditional religions and lifestyles in their continent. The American Black Power movement also influenced Kuti's political views; he supported Pan-Africanism and socialism and called for a united, democratic African republic. African leaders he supported during his lifetime include Kwame Nkrumah and Thomas Sankara. Kuti was a candid supporter of human rights, and many of his songs are direct attacks against dictatorships, specifically the militaristic governments of Nigeria in the 1970s and 1980s. He also criticized fellow Africans (especially the upper class) for betraying traditional African culture.

In 1978 Kuti became a polygamist when he simultaneously married 27 women. The highly publicized wedding served many purposes: it marked the one-year anniversary of Kuti and his wives surviving the Nigerian government's attack on the Kalakuta Republic in 1977, and also formalized Kuti's relationships with the women living with him; this legal status prevented the Nigerian government from raiding Kuti's compound on the grounds that Kuti had kidnapped the women. Kuti also described polygamy as logical and convenient: "A man goes for many women in the first place. Like in Europe, when a man is married when the wife is sleeping, he goes out and sleeps around. He should bring the women in the house, man, to live with him, and stop running around the streets!" Some characterize his views towards women as misogyny and typically cite songs like "Mattress" as further evidence. In a more complex example, he mocks African women's aspiration to European standards of ladyhood while extolling the values of the market woman in "Lady". However, Kuti also critiqued what he considered aberrant displays of African masculinity. In his songs "J.J.D. (Johnny Just Drop)" and "Gentleman", Kuti mocks African men's culturally and politically inappropriate adoption of European standards and declares himself "African man: Original".

Kuti was also an outspoken critic of the United States. At a meeting during his 1981 Amsterdam tour, he "complained about the psychological warfare that American organizations like ITT and the CIA waged against developing nations in terms of language". Because terms such as Third World, undeveloped, or non-aligned countries imply inferiority, Kuti felt they should not be used.

Legacy 

Kuti is remembered as an influential icon who voiced his opinions on matters that affected the nation through his music. Since 1998, the Felabration festival, an idea pioneered by his daughter Yeni Kuti, is held each year at the New Afrika Shrine to celebrate the life of this music legend and his birthday. Since Kuti's death in 1997, there has been a revival of his influence in music and popular culture, culminating in another re-release of his catalog controlled by UMG, Broadway, and off-Broadway shows, and new bands, such as Antibalas, who carry the Afrobeat banner to a new generation of listeners.

In 1999, Universal Music France, under Francis Kertekian, remastered the 45 albums that it owned and released them on 26 compact discs. These titles were licensed globally, except in Nigeria and Japan, where other companies owned Kuti's music. In 2005, the American operations of UMG licensed all of its world-music titles to the UK-based label Wrasse Records, which repackaged the same 26 discs for distribution in the United States (where they replaced the titles issues by MCA) and the UK. In 2009, Universal created a new deal for the US and Europe, with Knitting Factory Records and PIAS respectively, which included the release of the Broadway cast recording of the musical Fela! In 2013, FKO Ltd., the entity that owned the rights to all of Kuti's compositions, was acquired by BMG Rights Management.

In 2003, the Black President exhibition debuted at the New Museum for Contemporary Art, New York, and featured concerts, symposia, films, and 39 international artists' works.

American singer Bilal recorded a remake of Kuti's 1977 song "Sorrow Tears and Blood" for his second album, Love for Sale, featuring a guest rap by Common. Bilal cited Kuti's mix of jazz and folk tastes as an influence on his music.

The 2007 film The Visitor, directed by Thomas McCarthy, depicted a disconnected professor (Richard Jenkins) who wanted to play the djembe; he learns from a young Syrian (Haaz Sleiman) who tells the professor he will never truly understand African music unless he listens to Fela. The film features clips of Kuti's "Open and Close" and "Je'nwi Temi (Don't Gag Me)".

In 2008, an off-Broadway production about Kuti's life, entitled Fela! and inspired by the 1982 biography Fela, Fela! This Bitch of a Life by Carlos Moore, began with a collaborative workshop between the Afrobeat band Antibalas and Tony award-winner Bill T. Jones. The production was a massive success, and sold-out performances during its run and gained critical acclaim. On 22 November 2009, Fela! began a run on Broadway at the Eugene O'Neill Theatre. Jim Lewis helped co-write the script (along with Jones) and obtained producer backing from Jay-Z and Will Smith, among others. On 4 May 2010, Fela! was nominated for 11 Tony Awards, including Best Musical, Best Book of a Musical, Best Direction of a Musical for Bill T. Jones, Best Leading Actor in a Musical for Sahr Ngaujah, and Best Featured Actress in a Musical for Lillias White. In 2011, the London production of Fela! (staged at the Royal National Theatre) was filmed. On 11 June 2012, it was announced that Fela! would return to Broadway for 32 performances.

On 18 August 2009, DJ J.Period released a free mixtape to the general public, entitled The Messengers. It is a collaboration with Somali-born hip-hop artist K'naan paying tribute to Kuti, Bob Marley, and Bob Dylan.

Two months later, Knitting Factory Records began re-releasing the 45 titles controlled by UMG, starting with yet another re-release in the US of the compilation The Best of the Black President, which was completed and released in 2013.

Fela Son of Kuti: The Fall of Kalakuta is a stage play written by Onyekaba Cornel Best in 2010. It has had triumphant acclaim as part of that year's Felabration and returned in 2014 at the National Theatre and Freedom Park in Lagos. The play deals with events in a hideout, a day after the fall of Kalakuta.

The full-length documentary film Finding Fela, directed by Alex Gibney, premiered at the 2014 Sundance Film Festival.

A biographical film by Focus Features, directed by Steve McQueen and written by Biyi Bandele, was rumoured to be in production in 2010, with Chiwetel Ejiofor in the lead role. However, by 2014, the proposal was no longer produced under Focus Features, and while he maintained his role as the main writer, McQueen was replaced by Andrew Dosunmu as the director. McQueen told The Hollywood Reporter that the film was "dead".

The 2019 documentary film My Friend Fela (Meu amigo Fela) by Joel Zito Araújo, explores the complexity of Kuti's life "through the eyes and conversations" of his biographer Carlos Moore.

The collaborative jazz/afrobeat album Rejoice by Tony Allen and Hugh Masekela, released in 2020, includes the track "Never (Lagos Never Gonna Be the Same)", a tribute to Kuti, through whom Allen and Masekela first met in the 1970s.

Kuti's song "Zombie" has appeared in the video game Grand Theft Auto: IV, and he was posthumously nominated to the Rock & Roll Hall of Fame in 2021.

In 2021, Hulu released a six-episode documentary miniseries McCartney 3,2,1 in which Paul McCartney is quoted as saying of a visit to see Fela Kuti at the African Shrine, Kuti's club outside of Lagos, in the early 1970s: "The music was so incredible that I wept. Hearing that was one of the greatest music moments of my life."

On 1 November 2021, a blue plaque was unveiled by the Nubian Jak Community Trust at 12 Stanlake Road, Shepherd's Bush, where Kuti first lived when he came to London in 1958 and was studying music at Trinity College. The event included tributes from Kuti's daughter Shalewa Ransome-Kuti, Resonance FM broadcaster Debbie Golt, Kuti's former manager Rikki Stein, cover artist Lemi Ghariokwu, and others.

In 2022, Kuti was inducted into the Black Music & Entertainment Walk of Fame. In 2023, Rolling Stone ranked Kuti at number 188 on its list of the 200 Greatest Singers of All Time.

Discography

Studio albums

 Fela Fela Fela (1970)
 Fela's London Scene (1971)
 Why Black Man Dey Suffer (1971)
 Open & Close (1971)
 Na Poi (1971)
 Shakara (1972)
 Roforofo Fight (1972)
 Afrodisiac (1973)
 Gentleman (1973)
 Alagbon Close (1974)
 Noise for Vendor Mouth (1975)
 Confusion (1975)
 Everything Scatter (1975)
 Expensive Shit (1975)
 He Miss Road (1975)
 Unnecessary Begging (1976)
 Kalakuta Show (1976)
 Upside Down (1976)
 Ikoyi Blindness (1976)
 Before I Jump Like Monkey Give Me Banana (1976)
 Excuse-O (1976)
 Yellow Fever (1976)
 Zombie (1977)
 Stalemate (1977)
 No Agreement (1977)
 Sorrow Tears and Blood (1977)
 Shuffering and Shmiling (1978)
 Unknown Soldier (1979)
 I.T.T. (International Thief Thief) (1980)
 Music of Many Colours (1980) (with Roy Ayers)
 Authority Stealing (1980)
 Original Sufferhead (1981)
 Perambulator (1983)
 Army Arrangement (1985)
 I Go Shout Plenty (1986)
 Beasts of No Nation (1989)
 Confusion Break Bones (1990)
 O.D.O.O. (Overtake Don Overtake Overtake) (1990)
 Underground System (1992)
 The Best Best of Fela Kuti (1999)

Live albums
 Live! (with Ginger Baker) (1971)
 J.J.D. (Johnny Just Drop!!) (1977)
 V.I.P. (Vagabonds in Power) (1979)
 Live in Amsterdam (1983)
 Live in Detroit 1986 (2010)

FilmographyArena - Fela Kuti: Father of Afrobeat,2020 Plimsoll MamaPut Film for BBCMy Friend Fela, 2019, Joel Zito Araújo (Casa de Criação Cinema)Finding Fela, 2014, Alex Gibney and Jack Gulick (Jigsaw Productions)Femi Kuti — Live at the Shrine, 2005, recorded live in Lagos, Nigeria (Palm Pictures)Fela Live! Fela Anikulapo-Kuti and the Egypt '80 Band, 1984, recorded live at Glastonbury, England (Yazoo)Fela Kuti: Teacher Don't Teach Me Nonsense & Berliner Jazztage '78 (Double Feature), 1984 (Lorber Films)Fela in Concert, 1981 (VIEW)Music Is the Weapon, 1982, Stéphane Tchalgadjieff and Jean-Jacques Flori (Universal Music)

References
Notes

Further reading
 

Chude, Olisaemeka (11 November 2015), "Let's keep felabrating" , Ayiba magazine

 (Authorised biography). New edition Chicago Review Press, 2009 (with Introduction by Margaret Busby and foreword by Gilberto Gil); Nigerian edition Cassava Republic Press (with Prologue by Lindsay Barrett).
 

 
 

 Wilmer, Val (September 2011), "Fela Kuti in London", in The Wire, No. 331.

External links

Alex Hannaford, "'He was in a godlike state'", The Guardian'', 25 July 2007.
Fela Kuti biography  at World Music Central; includes biography and discography

 
1938 births
1997 deaths
AIDS-related deaths in Nigeria
Amnesty International prisoners of conscience held by Nigeria
Capitol Records artists
EMI Records artists
Nigerian bandleaders
MCA Records artists
Mercury Records artists
Nigerian male musicians
Nigerian saxophonists
Nigerian songwriters
Nigerian pan-Africanists
Nigerian socialists
Musicians from Abeokuta
Alumni of Trinity College of Music
World music musicians
Yoruba musicians
Ransome-Kuti family
Political music artists
Yoruba activists
English-language singers from Nigeria
Yoruba-language singers
20th-century saxophonists
20th-century multi-instrumentalists
20th-century Nigerian male singers
Culture of the African diaspora
Nigerian prisoners and detainees
Nigerian composers
Knitting Factory Records artists
Critics of Christianity
Critics of Islam
People educated at Abeokuta Grammar School